
The year 503 BC was a year of the pre-Julian Roman calendar. In the Roman Empire it was known as the Year of the Consulship of Lanatus and Tubertus (or, less frequently, year 251  Ab urbe condita). The denomination 503 BC for this year has been used since the early medieval period, when the Anno Domini calendar era became the prevalent method in Europe for naming years.

Events 
 By place 

 Roman Republic 
 The Latin towns of Pometia and Cora, with the assistance of the Aurunci, revolt against Rome.

Births
Zhuansun Shi, a disciple of Confucius

Deaths
Publius Valerius Publicola (or Poplicola, his agnomen meaning "friend of the people"), one of four Roman aristocrats who led the overthrow of the monarchy.

References